The 1950–51 Oberliga  was the sixth season of the Oberliga, the first tier of the football league system in West Germany. The league operated in five regional divisions, Berlin, North, South, Southwest and West. The five league champions and the runners-up from the south, north and west then entered the 1951 German football championship which was won by 1. FC Kaiserslautern. It was 1. FC Kaiserslautern's first-ever national championship.

The 1950–51 season was the first without clubs from East Berlin in the Oberliga, with VfB Pankow and Union Oberschöneweide having left the league, the latter to be replaced by the West Berlin club Union 06 Berlin, formed by former Oberschöneweide players who had moved to the West. It was also the last without the clubs from the Saar Protectorate, which had left the West German league system in 1948, but returned in 1951–52, with 1. FC Saarbrücken and Borussia Neunkirchen rejoining the Oberliga Südwest. Eventually, on 1 January 1957, the Saar Protectorate would officially join West Germany, ending the post-Second World War political separation of the territory from the other parts of Germany.

A similar-named league, the DDR-Oberliga, existed in East Germany, set at the first tier of the East German football league system. The 1950–51 DDR-Oberliga was won by BSG Chemie Leipzig.

Oberliga Nord
The 1950–51 season saw three new clubs in the league, FC Altona 93, Itzehoer SV and Eintracht Osnabrück, all promoted from the Amateurliga. The league's top scorer was Herbert Wojtkowiak of Hamburger SV with 40 goals, the highest total for the five Oberligas in 1950–51 and throughout the 16-year history of the Oberliga Nord.

Oberliga Berlin
The 1950–51 season saw four new clubs in the league, Union 06 Berlin, Minerva 93 Berlin, SC Westend 01 and Blau-Weiß 90 Berlin, all promoted from the Amateurliga Berlin. The league's top scorer was Paul Salisch of  SC Union 06 Berlin with 29 goals.

Oberliga West
The 1950–51 season saw four new clubs in the league, Fortuna Düsseldorf, Sportfreunde Katernberg, Rheydter SV and Borussia München-Gladbach, all promoted from the 2. Oberliga West. The league's top scorer was Hans Kleina of  FC Schalke 04 with 25 goals.

Oberliga Südwest
The 1950–51 season saw two new clubs in the league, TuRa Ludwigshafen and Eintracht Kreuznach, both promoted from the Amateurliga. The league's top scorer was Ottmar Walter of 1. FC Kaiserslautern with 29 goals.

Oberliga Süd
The 1950–51 season saw four new clubs in the league, VfL Neckarau and SV Darmstadt 98, both promoted from the Landesligas, while SSV Reutlingen and FC Singen 04 moved across from the southern division of the Oberliga Südwest. The league's top scorer was Max Morlock of 1. FC Nürnberg with 28 goals.

German championship

The 1951 German football championship was contested by the eight qualified Oberliga teams and won by 1. FC Kaiserslautern, defeating Preußen Münster in the final. The eight clubs played a home-and-away round of matches in two groups of four. The two group winners then advanced to the final.

Group 1

Group 2

Final

|}

References

Sources
 30 Jahre Bundesliga  30th anniversary special, publisher: kicker Sportmagazin, published: 1993
 kicker-Almanach 1990  Yearbook of German football, publisher: kicker Sportmagazin, published: 1989, 
 DSFS Liga-Chronik seit 1945  publisher: DSFS, published: 2005
 100 Jahre Süddeutscher Fußball-Verband  100 Years of the Southern German Football Federation, publisher: SFV, published: 1997

External links
 The Oberligas on Fussballdaten.de 

1950-51
1
Ger